Gnoerichia is a monotypic genus of African crab spiders containing the single species, Gnoerichia buettneri. It was first described by Friedrich Dahl in 1907, and is found in Cameroon.

See also
 List of Thomisidae species

References

Endemic fauna of Cameroon
Monotypic Araneomorphae genera
Spiders of Africa
Thomisidae